New York's 9th State Assembly district is one of the 150 districts in the New York State Assembly. It has been represented by Republican Michael Fitzpatrick since 2003.

Geography
District 8 is in Suffolk County. The district includes the town of Smithtown and portions of the town of Islip.

Recent election results

2022

2020

2018

2016

2014

2012

References

8
Suffolk County, New York